Timothy John McFarland (born June 8, 1989) is an American professional baseball pitcher in the New York Mets organization. He has previously played in Major League Baseball (MLB) for the Baltimore Orioles, Arizona Diamondbacks, Oakland Athletics, and St. Louis Cardinals.

Career
McFarland attended Amos Alonzo Stagg High School in Palos Hills, Illinois, where he played for the school's baseball and basketball teams for four years. As a senior, McFarland recorded 103 strikeouts while walking only 13 in  innings pitched. He signed a letter of intent to attend the University of Missouri and play college baseball for the Missouri Tigers baseball team.

Cleveland Indians
The Cleveland Indians selected McFarland in the fourth round of the 2007 MLB draft. Rather than attend Missouri, McFarland signed with the Indians. While pitching for the Kinston Indians of the Class A-Advanced Carolina League in 2010, he was named to the all-star game.

Baltimore Orioles

After spending the 2012 season with the Akron Aeros of the Class AA Eastern League and the Columbus Clippers of the Class AAA International League, the Baltimore Orioles selected McFarland from the Indians in the 2012 Rule 5 draft. After a strong spring training, he was named to the Orioles' Opening Day roster. The Orioles traded fellow relief pitcher Luis Ayala in April 2013, further solidifying McFarland's hold on a roster spot and improving his chances of staying with Baltimore; a Rule 5 pick must remain with the MLB team that drafted him for the entire season or be offered back to the original team for $25,000. He earned his first career major league win on June 13, pitching an inning of relief against the Boston Red Sox. He made his first career start on June 28 against the New York Yankees. In his first full major league season, McFarland made 38 appearances with all but one in relief.

McFarland earned his first major league win as a starter on July 1, 2014, against the Texas Rangers.

Arizona Diamondbacks

McFarland signed a minor league contract with the Arizona Diamondbacks on March 3, 2017, one week after he was released by the Orioles. The Diamondbacks promoted him to the major leagues on April 27. On December 6, 2017, McFarland signed a one-year, $850,000 contract with the Diamondbacks. In 2018, McFarland posted a career-best 2.00 ERA in 47 appearances. In 2019, he went 0–0 with a 4.82 ERA over 56 innings for the Diamondbacks.

Oakland Athletics
On November 4, 2019, McFarland was claimed off waivers by the Oakland Athletics. In 2020 for Oakland, McFarland pitched to a 4.35 ERA with 9 strikeouts over 20.2 innings pitched in 20 appearances. He became a free agent after the shortened 2020 season.

Washington Nationals
On February 16, 2021, McFarland signed a minor league contract with the Washington Nationals organization. On March 27, McFarland was released by the Nationals. On March 31, McFarland re-signed with the Nationals on a new minor league contract. He was assigned to the Triple-A Rochester Red Wings to begin the 2021 season, and logged a 5.25 ERA in 18 appearances before he was released on June 30.

St. Louis Cardinals
On June 30, 2021, McFarland signed a split contract with the St. Louis Cardinals organization, claiming that he had a better chance to get called up in St. Louis than in Washington. On July 16, McFarland's contract was selected to the active roster. He spent the remainder of the season with St. Louis, going 4–1 with a 2.56 ERA in 38 relief appearances. In  innings pitched, McFarland recorded 21 strikeouts and 12 double plays, the latter of which set a new franchise record after the All-Star break. He was the losing pitcher in the NL Wild Card Game, surrendering a walk to Cody Bellinger, who later scored on Chris Taylor's tie-breaking walk-off home run.

On November 8, 2021, McFarland signed a one-year contract to return to the Cardinals. On August 10, 2022, McFarland was designated for assignment. At the time, he had a 6.61 ERA in 28 relief appearances. After his release, McFarland was re-signed by the Cardinals to a minor league contract on August 23. He was assigned to the Triple-A Memphis Redbirds. He elected free agency on November 10, 2022.

New York Mets
On January 3, 2023, McFarland signed a minor league deal with the New York Mets.

Personal life
McFarland and his wife, Jenna, married in 2016 and welcomed their first child, a son, in November 2021. 

In 2018, McFarland graduated from the University of Phoenix with a degree in business management.

References

External links

1989 births
Living people
People from Palos Hills, Illinois
Sportspeople from Cook County, Illinois
Major League Baseball pitchers
Baseball players from Illinois
Baltimore Orioles players
Arizona Diamondbacks players
Oakland Athletics players
St. Louis Cardinals players
Gulf Coast Indians players
Lake County Captains players
Kinston Indians players
Akron Aeros players
Phoenix Desert Dogs players
Columbus Clippers players
Caribes de Anzoátegui players
American expatriate baseball players in Venezuela
Norfolk Tides players
Aberdeen IronBirds players
Gulf Coast Orioles players
Frederick Keys players
Bowie Baysox players
Reno Aces players
Rochester Red Wings players
Memphis Redbirds players